Ahnert may refer to:

Other
3181 Ahnert, an asteroid

People
Paul Oswald Ahnert (1897-1989), German astronomer
Eva Ahnert-Rohlfs (1912-1954), German astronomer
Heinrich-Wilhelm Ahnert, German World War I officer